Castel Rigone is a frazione of the comune (municipality) of Passignano sul Trasimeno, Umbria, central Italy.

As of 2001, it had 406 inhabitants, and is located 12 km from Passignano. According to tradition, the name derives from that of an Ostrogoth commander, Rigo, who in 543 had set here a base for the siege of Perugia during the Gothic Wars.

The village has a late 15th-century church (Madonna del Miracoli), built by a pupil of Bramante.

It's the hometown of the Italian Fashion Designer Brunello Cucinelli.

Economy and Events 
Due to its excellent position on the high hills of Trasimeno, the town is a tourist destination and has a strong development in agritourism. The proximity of vast wooded areas also makes it ideal for trekking, horseback riding and bird watching enthusiasts. There is a small amusement park, currently in poor condition. The offer of services is completed by a minimarket, a pharmacy, a doctor's office, some ATMs, various bars and a mechanical workshop. 

Since the Middle Ages the village has been renowned for the treatment of respiratory diseases (Clinica La Castellana). The small hospital still exists (now the seat of an Archconfraternity built in the 15th century by the Sovereign Hospitaller Order of St. John, Rhodes and Malta (Order of Malta) as an annex of their settlement and Castello di Magione (6 km) still owned of the order.

Every year there is the Festa dei Barbari and the Giostra di Arrigo (since 1984), to commemorate the era of the Ostrogoth foundation. The historical processions in costume take place in the first week of August, coinciding with the Celtic festival of Lughnasadh (in honor of the god Lugh, giver of abundance and wisdom). 

Also every year (since 1997) a very popular International Festival of Young Concert Players is held in July and August, with the participation of numerous national and international artists and high-level "ensembles", in the suggestive Piazza Sant'Agostino and in the Church of the Madonna of Miracles.

Notable People 
 Brunello Cucinelli (b.1953), Fashion Designer.

References

Hilltowns in Umbria
Frazioni of the Province of Perugia